Stacey Blumer  (born 11 December 1969) is an American freestyle skier. She was born in Altus, Oklahoma. She competed at the 1998 Winter Olympics in Nagano, in women's aerials.

References

External links 
 

1969 births
People from Altus, Oklahoma
Living people
American female freestyle skiers
Olympic freestyle skiers of the United States
Freestyle skiers at the 1998 Winter Olympics
21st-century American women